Edward W. Kolb, known as Rocky Kolb, (born October 2, 1951) is a cosmologist and a professor at the University of Chicago as well as the dean of Physical Sciences. He has worked on many aspects of the Big Bang cosmology, including baryogenesis, nucleosynthesis and dark matter. He is author, with Michael Turner, of the popular textbook The Early Universe (Addison-Wesley, 1990). Additionally, alongside his co-author Michael Turner, Kolb was awarded the 2010 Dannie Heineman Prize for Astrophysics.

Doctor Kolb is married to Adrienne Kolb, a historian of science, and has three children.

References

External links
 

American cosmologists
Living people
University of Chicago faculty
Winners of the Dannie Heineman Prize for Astrophysics
1951 births